"Bye Bye" is Miliyah Kato's eighteenth single. It was released on March 24, 2010.

Promotion and tie-ups
The title track was the opening theme song for late night music television show CDTV during April and May 2010.

Track listing

Charts and sales

References

External links 
 Official website

Miliyah Kato songs
2010 singles
RIAJ Digital Track Chart number-one singles
2010 songs